'89 Live in Japan is a DVD released by American heavy metal band Quiet Riot on November 16, 2004.

DVD track listing
Party All Night (DuBrow)
I'm Fallin' (Banali, Cavazo, Proffer, Shortino, Waldo)
Stay With Me Tonight (Banali, Cavazo, Proffer, Shortino)
Run To You (Banali, Cavazo, Shortino, Waldo)
The Wild And The Young (Banali, Cavazo, DuBrow, Proffer, Wright)
Joker (Banali, Cavazo, Kirksey, Proffer, Shortino)
Drum Solo (Banali)
Coppin' A Feel (Banali, Cavazo, Dean, Shortino)
King Of The Hill (Banali, Cavazo, Rabin, Shortino)
Cum On Feel The Noize (Holder, Lea) (Slade Cover)
Stay With Me

Personnel

Quiet Riot
Paul Shortino – lead vocals
Carlos Cavazo – guitars
Sean McNabb – bass
Frankie Banali – drums

Additional musicians
Jimmy Waldo – keyboards

References

2004 live albums
2004 video albums
Live video albums
Quiet Riot live albums
Quiet Riot video albums